Ruff Ryders: Past, Present, Future is the fifth compilation album from American hip hop record label Ruff Ryders Entertainment, released on November 21, 2011.

Track listing 

"World's Greatest" performed by Drag-On, Mook, DMX, The LOX and Swizz Beatz Prod. Kevin Randolph
"Get Your Money Up" performed by DMX
"Hot Steppa" performed by Eve
"Hip Hop" performed by Swizz Beatz and Drag-On
"Beat and a Microphone" performed by Mook
"You Know" performed by Mook Prod. Kevin Randolph
"Freaky" performed by Shella, Akon, Mook and Jadakiss
"I'm Gone" performed by Q and Shella
"Want Me" performed by Shella
"Off the Cuff" performed by Swizz Beatz
"Showtime" performed by Swizz Beatz and Lil Waah
"Watcha You Gonna Do" performed by Cassidy
"Love Potion" performed by Hugo
"What to Do" performed by Shella and The LOX Prod. Kevin Randolph

References

2011 compilation albums
Ruff Ryders Entertainment compilation albums
Record label compilation albums
Hip hop compilation albums
Albums produced by Swizz Beatz
East Coast hip hop compilation albums